St. Johns Industrial Air Park  is a city-owned public-use airport located  north of the central business district of St. Johns, a city in Apache County, Arizona, United States. The airport is included in the FAA's National Plan of Integrated Airport Systems for 2009–2013, which categorizes it as a general aviation facility. The NPIAS report for 2015–2019 classified the Air Park again as General Aviation, in the "Basic" asset category, for airports with the lowest levels of activity.

Facilities and aircraft 
It has two asphalt paved runways:
 14/32 is 5,322 by 75 feet (1,622 x 23 m).
 3/21 is 3,400 by 60 feet (1,036 x 18 m).

For the 12-month period ending April 28, 2010, the airport had 15,800 aircraft operations, an average of 43 per day: 98% general aviation and 2% military. At that time there were six aircraft based at this airport, all single-engine. The data for the 2015 report indicated that five aircraft were based there in 2014, and projected $1,547,844 in planned development of the airport for the five-year period ending in 2019.

References

External links 
 St. Johns Industrial Airpark (SJN) at Arizona DOT airport directory
 Aerial image as of 31 May 1996 from USGS The National Map
 

Airports in Apache County, Arizona